The Umm Salal Stadium is a proposed football stadium which will be built in Umm Salal, Qatar. It is being designed by Albert Speer & Partner GmbH.

Plans
Umm Salal Stadium will be able to support 45,120 fans. The conceptual design of the stadium is based on traditional Arabian forts. Post World Cup, the stadium will decrease its capacity to 25,500 seats and it will be used by Umm Salal F.C. as their home ground.

References

Proposed stadiums
Proposed buildings and structures in Qatar
Umm Salal